Snoopy's Reunion is the 34th prime-time animated TV special based upon the comic strip Peanuts, by Charles M. Schulz. It originally aired on the CBS network on May 1, 1991 as part of the animated anthology series Toon Nite. It is one of three Peanuts projects to date (the other being Snoopy, Come Home) not to have "Charlie Brown" in the title (though the working title was Those Were the Days, Charlie Brown) and one of the few Peanuts specials to feature adults on-screen.

Summary
At the Daisy Hill Puppy Farm, a group of beagles are born to a dog named Missy: Spike, Belle, Olaf, Molly, Rover, Andy, and Snoopy. The puppies spend their time on the farm enjoying food and playing music with each other, but sadly await the day they will all be separated as they are sold by the farmer to new owners. Meanwhile, Charlie Brown, depressed from a recent defeat in baseball, expresses a desire to his sister Sally to have his own dog.

Snoopy is the first puppy to be sold, to a girl named Lila (previously seen in Snoopy Come Home). The other puppies follow, with Olaf being the last one. The farmer and Missy believe that the puppies have gone off to permanent, better lives. Snoopy and Lila bond easily, but after owning him for some time Lila learns that the landlord has changed the rules in her apartment complex, forbidding the ownership of dogs. Heartbroken, she is forced to take Snoopy back to the farm. The farmer assures Snoopy that they will find him a new home.

Charlie Brown discovers an ad in the paper placed by the Daisy Hill Puppy Farm, and travels there with Linus. Charlie Brown and Snoopy meet for the first time, and quickly bond. On their way home, Linus informs Charlie Brown that Snoopy was previously owned by someone else. Charlie Brown declares it does not matter as Snoopy is now his dog. He quickly learns that Snoopy is a rather unusual dog, from sleeping on the roof of his doghouse  to taking up human activities like sports.

Five years later, Charlie Brown notices that Snoopy misses his family, and proposes a reunion at the Daisy Hill Puppy Farm. They send out invitations to his siblings, who all agree to attend, bringing their instruments along. When they get to the site of the farm, however, they discover that it was sold for redevelopment and is now buried beneath a parking garage. Though disappointed, the siblings choose to go on with their reunion, playing their instruments together as they did when they were puppies.

At the end of the reunion, Charlie Brown wonders aloud how Snoopy's siblings will get home. Snoopy adapts his World War I flying ace persona and proceeds to fly all of his siblings home on his doghouse. An incredulous Charlie Brown asks Linus how this is even possible, to which Linus replies, "Well, he's your dog, Charlie Brown."

Continuity
Charles Schulz did not consider material from the television specials and films to be canonical with the Peanuts comic strip.  This results in the following continuity errors:
In the comic strip, Snoopy existed as Charlie Brown's dog long before Sally and Linus were born.  In this special, Charlie Brown doesn't acquire him until long after they were born.
In the comic strip, Charlie Brown and Snoopy knew each other way before Charlie Brown adopted Snoopy. In this special, Charlie Brown sees Snoopy for the first time.
In the comic strip, Snoopy acts as an ordinary dog prior to his adoption by Charlie Brown. In this special, he is already well talented when Charlie Brown adopts him.
In Snoopy, Come Home, Lila had to take Snoopy back to the Daisy Hill Puppy Farm because Lila and her parents moved to an apartment building where the landlord did not allow dogs. In this special during the flashback, Lila says she has to take Snoopy back because the landlord has made a new rule saying no dogs allowed.
Originally in the strip and later in the 1972 movie Snoopy, Come Home and the 1980 special Life Is a Circus, Charlie Brown, Charlie Brown tells Linus about how a kid dumped sand on him and made him cry, and the next day he and his parents went to the Daisy Hill Puppy Farm to get Snoopy.  In this special, they both go to get him.
In the strip and Snoopy, Come Home, Linus calls the Daisy Hill Puppy Farm to find out about Snoopy's history when he goes to see Lila in the hospital, and finds out that he was a "used dog".  In this special, when Charlie Brown and Linus go to pick him up, Linus finds out about his history in a ledger sitting on a desk.
In the strip, Snoopy (and Woodstock) find out on their own that the Daisy Hill Puppy Farm (Snoopy's old home) was closed and demolished and turned into a parking garage. In the special Charlie Brown discovers this and shows this to Snoopy and his siblings. Charlie Brown even says a line similar to what Snoopy says in the strip: "Do you realize what happened? They're parking on your memories.". In the strip, however, Snoopy is shown with Woodstock at this. Snoopy (as Woodstock looks on) says about the parking garage (which is what the puppy farm was turned into after it was demolished), "YOU STUPID PEOPLE! YOU ARE PARKING ON MY MEMORIES!".

Voice cast
Phil Shafran as Charlie Brown
Josh Keaton as Linus van Pelt
Kaitlyn Walker as Sally Brown
Bill Melendez as Snoopy and his siblings
Megan Parlen as Lillian "Lila" Emmons Allcroft
Laurel Page as Lila's mom
Steve Stoliar as Bus driver/Mr. Allcroft

References

External links
 

Peanuts television specials
Television shows directed by Sam Jaimes
1990s American television specials
1990s animated television specials
1990s American animated films
1991 films
1991 television specials
1991 in American television
CBS original programming
CBS television specials
Television shows written by Charles M. Schulz